Cosuenda is a municipality located in the province of Zaragoza, Aragon, Spain. According to the 2004 census (INE), the municipality has a population of 392 inhabitants.

This town is located at the feet of the Sierra de Algairén in the comarca of Campo de Cariñena.

References

Municipalities in the Province of Zaragoza